The Messenger is Casey Jones's second album release. It was released in on June 6, 2006, by Eulogy Recordings.

Track listing
"1 Out of 3 Had an STD" - 1:54
"Coke Bongs and Sing-A-Longs" - 2:07
"No Donnie, These Men Are Straight Edge" - 2:02
"Lessons" - 2:35
"Nothing to Lose" – 4:35
"Any Port in the Storm" – 2:23
"The Sober" – 2:08
"Medic" – 2:02
"Bite the Dust" – 1:54
"Times Up" – 1:24
"Punch-A-Size" – 3:05
"Shitstorm" – 2:35

"No Donnie, These Men are Straight Edge" is a play on the Evergreen Terrace song "No Donnie, These Men are Nihilist" from their album Burned Alive by Time.

Casey Jones (band) albums
2006 albums
Eulogy Recordings albums